Cusino Township was a civil township in Schoolcraft County in the U.S. state of Michigan.  It was first established on March 7, 1907. It was combined with and incorporated into Hiawatha Township on April 16, 1913.

References

Defunct townships in Michigan
Former populated places in Schoolcraft County, Michigan
1907 establishments in Michigan
1913 disestablishments in Michigan
Populated places established in 1907